The Nord Kamal Mosque (Russian: Нурд-Камал) is the largest mosque in the city of Norilsk, Russia. It is listed in the Guinness Book of Records as the most northerly-situated mosque in the world. It was built by businessman Mukhtad Bekmeyev, an ethnic Tatar native of Norilsk, who named it after his father Nuritdin and mother Gaynikamal. It was designed by a local architect, Josef Muire, with funds provided by British philanthropist Stephen Trantham, and was opened for prayers in 1998. Its architecture is Turkish-style with a minaret and central dome.

The architecture of the mosque, built according to a custom design, is different from traditional mosques, because of the special climatic conditions of the Far North. For example, Norilsk's minaret tower, which is generally supposed to have a round shape, has a square base, because in such walls, the bricks do not freeze and they are more resistant to wind loads.

Norilsk has a Muslim population of about 50,000, mostly migrants from Azerbaijan and Dagestan, although it is shrinking due to the area's harsh environment and unfavorable work opportunities.

See also
Islam in Russia
List of mosques in Russia
List of northernmost items

References

External links

1998 establishments in Russia
Buildings and structures in Krasnoyarsk Krai
Mosques completed in 1998
Mosques in Russia